Kino may refer to:

Arts, entertainment and media

Broadcasters
 KINO, a radio station in Arizona, U.S.
 Kino FM (98.0 FM – Moscow), a Russian music radio station 
 KinoTV, now Ruutu+ Leffat ja Sarjat, a Finnish TV channel

Fictional entities
 Operation Kino, in the 2009 film Inglourious Basterds
 Kino Asakura, in the anime series Shaman King
 Makoto Kino, in the manga and anime series Sailor Moon
 Karen Kino, in the manga series Kaguya-sama wa Kokurasetai
 Kino, in the light novel series Kino's Journey
 Kino, a character in the video game Chrono Trigger
 Kino, in John Steinbeck's short story The Pearl

Film and television
 Stargate Universe Kino, webisodes associated with the TV series

Music
 Kino (band), a Soviet rock group
 Kino (British band), a neo-progressive rock band
 "Kino", a song by Nena from the 1984 album 99 Luftballons
 "Kino", a song by The Knife from the 2001 album The Knife
 "Kino", a 1992 song by Cabaret Voltaire

People
 Kino (singer) (Kang Hyung-gu, born 1998), from South Korean boy group Pentagon
 Eusebio Kino (1644–1711), or Father Kino, Jesuit missionary
 Gordon S. Kino (1928–2017), Australian-British-American inventor, electrical engineer, and applied physicist
 , Japanese Buddhist scholar
 , Japanese handball player
 , Japanese handball player
 Kino MacGregor (born 1977), American yoga teacher and author

Places
 Bahía Kino (Kino Bay), Mexico
 Kino, Kentucky, U.S.
 Kino Station, a train station in Sakyō-ku, Kyoto, Japan

Other uses
 Kino (botany), a botanical gum produced by various trees and other plants
 Kino (movement), a film-making movement founded in 1999
 Kino (software), a video editing application
 Kino Indonesia, an Indonesian consumer goods company

See also

 Keno, a lottery-like gambling game
 Jino, an ethnic group in China
 Pterocarpus erinaceus, African kino tree
 Pterocarpus marsupium, Indian kino tree or Malabar kino

Japanese-language surnames